Flexicoelotes is a genus of spiders in the family Agelenidae. It was first described in 2015 by Chen, Li & Zhao.  it contains 5 species, all found in China.

References

Agelenidae
Araneomorphae genera
Spiders of China